Monique is a female given name. It is the French form of the name Monica. The name has enjoyed some popularity in the United States since about 1955, and is less common in other English-speaking countries except for Canada although mostly used by French speakers in Quebec and is rare in the English parts of Canada.

Notable people named Monique

Acting

 Monique Chaumette (born 1927), French actress
 Monique Coleman (born 1980), American actress, singer, and dancer
 Monique Gabriela Curnen (born 1970), American actress
 Monique Gabrielle (born 1963), American actress
 Mo'Nique Hicks (born 1967), American actress and comedian
 Monique Leyrac (1928-2019), Canadian singer and actress
 Monique Mélinand (1916–2012), French actress
 Monique Mercure (born 1930), Canadian actress
 Monique Mojica, Canadian playwright, director, and actor
 Monique Noel (born 1967), American glamour model and actress
 Monique van de Ven (born 1952), Dutch actress and film director
 Monique Heart (born 1986), the stage name of American drag queen Kevin Richardson
 Monique Williams, actress in Australian television series The Sleepover Club

Music

 Monique Brumby (born 1974), Australian singer-songwriter, guitarist, and producer
 Monique Buzzarté (born 1960), American composer, trombonist, and activist
 Monique Haas (1909–1987), French pianist
 Monique Melsen (born 1951), Luxembourgian singer
 Monique Powell, singer for American ska band Save Ferris
 Monique Rhodes, New Zealand singer, songwriter, and producer

Politics

 Monique Cerisier-ben Guiga (1942–2021), French politician
 Monique D. Davis (born 1936), American politician
 Monique Guay (born 1959), Quebec politician
 Monique Iborra (born 1945), French politician
 Monique Koeyers-Felida (1967–2016), Curaçaoan politician
 Monique Holsey-Hyman, American politician
 Monique Landry (born 1937), Canadian politician
 Monique Limon (born 1953), French politician
 Monique Limón (born 1979), American politician
 Monique Orphé (born 1964), French politician
 Monique Papon (1934–2018), French politician
 Monique Pauzé, Quebec politician
 Monique Richard (born 1947), Quebec politician
 Monique Smith (Canadian politician) (born  1965), Ontario politician
 Monique Vézina (born 1935), Canadian politician
 Monique de Vries (born 1947), Dutch politician
 Monique Wilson (politician), Saban politician

Sports
 Monique Adamczak (born 1983), Australian professional tennis player
 Monique Angermüller (born 1984), German speed skater
 Monique de Bruin (born 1965), Dutch cyclist
 Monique de Bruin (born 1977), American fencer
 Monique Burkland (born 1989), American Paralympic volleyball player
 Monique Cabral (born 1986), Trinidadian sprinter
 Monique Conti (born 1999), Australian basketball player
 Monique Drost (born 1964), Dutch swimmer
 Monique van de Elzen (born 1976), New Zealand footballer
 Monique Éwanjé-Épée (born 1967), French track and field athlete
 Monique Ferreira (born 1980), Brazilian freestyle swimmer
 Monique Garbrecht-Enfeldt (born 1968), German speed skater
 Monique Gladding (born 1981), British diver
 Monique Hennagan (born 1976), American track and field athlete
 Monique Hirovanaa (born 1966), New Zealand rugby player
 Monique Hoogland (born 1967), Dutch badminton player
 Monique Iannella (born 1996), Australian professional footballer
 Monique Jansen (born 1978), Dutch discus thrower
 Monique Kauffmann (born 1963), Dutch road cyclist and speed skater
 Monique Knol (born 1964), Dutch racing cyclist
 Monique Leroux (1938–1985), French fencer
 Monique Merrill (born 1969), American ski mountaineer and mountain biker
 Monique Murphy (born 1994), Australian swimmer
 Monique Olivier (born 1998), Luxembourgian swimmer
 Monique Riekewald (born 1979), German skeleton racer
 Monique Williams (born 1985), New Zealand sprinter
 Monique de Wilt (born 1976), Dutch pole vaulter

Other fields

 Monique Alexander (born 1982), American pornographic actress
 Monique Bégin (born 1936), Canadian academic and former politician
 Monique de Bissy (1923–2009), French-Belgian World War II resistance member
 Monique Boekaerts (born 1946), Belgian educationalist
 Monique Charbonneau (1928–2014), Canadian artist
 Monique Ganderton (born 1980), Canadian stuntwoman
 Monique Lhuillier (born 1971), Filipino-American fashion designer
 Monique Péan (born c. 1981), American fine jewelry designer
 Monique Pinçon-Charlot (born 1946), French sociologist
Monique Régimbald-Zeiber (born 1947), Canadian painter
 Monique de Roux (born 1946), French painter and engraver
 Monique Schwitter (born 1972), Swiss writer and actress
 Monique Sené, French nuclear physicist
 Monique Truong (born 1968), Vietnamese-American writer
 Monique Vinh Thuy (born 1946), widow of Vietnamese emperor Bảo Đại
 Monique Wadsted (born 1957), Swedish lawyer
 Monique Wittig (1935–2003), French writer and feminist theorist
 Monique Wright (born 1973), Australian journalist and television personality
 Norodom Monineath (born 1936), queen mother of Cambodia, sometimes referred to as Queen Monique

Fictional characters
 Monique, friend of Kim Possible
 Monique, a cat villager from the video game series Animal Crossing
 Monique Jeffries, character in American crime drama television series Law & Order: Special Victims Unit
 Monique Pollier, Orson Hodge's deceased mistress in Desperate Housewives

See also

Monica (given name)
 
 

French feminine given names